Wanessa Camargo is the third studio album by Brazilian singer Wanessa Camargo. It was released on December 5, 2002, by BMG Brasil and RCA Records. The album represented a departure from her previous studio albums which incorporate more elements of country music.

The album was a commercial success, selling over 350,000 copies in Brazil and receiving a gold certification by the Associação Brasileira dos Produtores de Discos (ABPD).

Background and development
Following the release of her second album Wanessa Camargo (2001), Camargo began recording material for her third album. The writing and production team includes Jason Deere, César Lemos and Silvio Richetto who were also involved in her previous album and were tasked with creating a more pop-sounding record.

Promotion and release 
In October 2002, Camargo performed two showcases in Lisbon and Porto and appeared on TV shows such as Lux, Olá Portugal and A Vida é Bela ahead of the album's release.

The first single, "Um Dia... Meu Primeiro Amor" was released on November 18, 2002. The music video was recorded on November 5, 2002. Camargo embarked on a heavy promotional campaign on Brazilian TV shows including Domingo Legal and Domingão do Faustão as well as Jovens Tardes, a daytime TV show that she had begun hosting a month prior.

A follow-up single, "Sem Querer" was released on April 9, 2003. The music video was recorded in May 2003.

Furthermore, in 2003, Camargo embarked on a concert tour named Turnê Olympia to promote the album.

Track listing

Certifications

References

2002 albums
Wanessa Camargo albums
Portuguese-language albums
RCA Records albums